Marina Tarlinskaja (sometimes transliterated "Tarlinskaya" or "Tarlinskaia") is a Russian-born American linguist specializing in the statistical
analysis of verse.

She uses the Russian linguistic-statistical method which, at the most basic level, counts the occurrences of word-stresses in ictic (strong) and non-ictic (weak) positions in lines of verse. From these, "stress profiles" can be built, by which bodies of verse of different periods, authors, genres, and even languages can be compared statistically.
In her 2014 book she used twelve parameters of verse analyses including syntactic structure of lines and the use of verse rhythm to emphasize meaning. Tarlinskaja successfully applied her methodology to defining the authorship of questionable Elizabethan poems and plays. Writing in 1981, T.V.F. Brogan called her English Verse: Theory and History "the most extensive and most important study of English verse structure produced in this century." In 2005 she received the Robert Fitzgerald Prosody Award. In The Times Literary Supplement Sir Brian Vickers called her Shakespeare and the Versification of English Drama, 1561-1642 (2014)  "the book of the year".

Tarlinskaja was born in Moscow and studied at the Foreign Language Institute, Moscow, receiving degrees of kandidat in 1967 and doktor filologicheskikh nauk in 1976, and teaching there from 1969 to 1981.

She emigrated to the United States in 1981, smuggling out a draft of her subsequent work Shakespeare's Verse with the help of her husband, L.K. Coachman. She currently is Professor Emerita in the University of Washington's Linguistics Department. Tarlinskaja is the author of five books and over 200 scholarly articles.

Major works

as co-translator

Notes

References

Living people
University of Washington faculty
Linguists from Russia
Linguists from the United States
Year of birth missing (living people)
Women linguists